Henry Augustus Muhlenberg III (1848–1906) was a prominent citizen of Reading, Pennsylvania and an unsuccessful candidate for the United States Congress with the Republican nomination in 1892.

Muhlenberg was born in Reading.  He was the son of Henry Augustus Muhlenberg (1823–1854) and Annie H. Muhlenberg Muhlenberg, who was a cousin of Henry Augustus on her father's side.

The young Muhlenberg studied with a tutor but later spent a year at Pennsylvania College, Gettysburg (now known as Gettysburg College).  He then began studies at Harvard University 1868.  He graduated from Harvard with honors, receiving a degree in history in  1872.  He then went to study law in the office of George F. Baer, Esq., being admitted to the bar of Berks County, Pennsylvania in 1875. He was main involved in business law.  He was a director in the Framers' National Bank, the Reading Trust Company, and the Mount Penn Gravity Railroad.  He was also a director and treasurer of the Reading City Passenger Railway Company, which he help found.  He was also a trustee of the Charles Evans Cemetery Company, a vestryman of Trinity Lutheran Church, and a member of the Valley Forge Park Commission, to which position he was appointed by two Governors of Pennsylvania.  He was a staunch Republican.

In 1892 Muhlenberg was nominated for Congress on the Republican ticket, but lost in the general election.

Sources
biography of Muhlenberg

Pennsylvania Republicans
1848 births
Harvard University alumni
1906 deaths
Gettysburg College alumni
Pennsylvania lawyers
People from Berks County, Pennsylvania
Politicians from Reading, Pennsylvania
Muhlenberg family